Bernard Wood may refer to:

 Bernard Wood (cricketer) (1886–1974), New Zealand cricketer, golfer and businessman
 Bernard Wood (geologist), British geologist
 Bernie Wood (1939–2013), New Zealand rugby league administrator and sports historian